Pseudozeuzera biatra is a moth in the family Cossidae. It was described by George Hampson in 1910. It is found in Ghana, Nigeria, Sierra Leone and Uganda.

References

Zeuzerinae
Moths described in 1910